The  is a type of 2-8-2 steam locomotive built by the Japanese Government Railways (JGR), the Japanese National Railways (JNR), and Kawasaki Heavy Industries Rolling Stock Company, Kisha Seizo, Hitachi, Nippon Sharyo, Mitsubishi, and Mitsubishi Heavy Industries from 1936 to 1945 and 1950 to 1951.

Design and operation 
The design of class D51 was based on the earlier D50, introduced in 1923. Wartime production featured some substitution of wood for steel parts like running boards, smoke deflectors and tender coal bunkers. A total of 1,115 D51s were built, the largest number in any single class of locomotive in Japan. Early D51s were nicknamed Namekuji-gata ("slug-form") for their shape. The locomotive was designed by Hideo Shima. It was used mainly in freight service through the 1960s. Some D51s were fitted with the Giesl ejector in Hokkaido to conserve on fuel.

Service outside Japan

Soviet Railways D51
The 30 specially built D51s that were left on Sakhalin (formerly Karafuto) by the retreating Japanese at the end of the Second Sino-Japanese War (1937-1945) and after the Soviet-Japanese War (1945), were used from 1945 until 1979 by Soviet Railways. One was left outside Yuzhno-Sakhalinsk railway station, and one is in running condition and is kept at the Yuzhno-Sakhalinsk railway station. Additionally two wrecks were left to the north of the city.

Korean National Railways Mika7
Two locomotives were built for the Korean National Railroad in 1950 by Mitsubishi for South Korea during the Korean War. Designated Mika7 (미카7) class, they were nearly identical to JNR class D51 except for the gauge.

Manila Railroad 300 class (1951)
According to the a journal published in 1956, ten locomotives were built by Nippon Sharyo for the Manila Railroad Company. These entered service in 1951. Numbered the 300 class, they were named after the cog locomotive class built in the 1910s for the Manila Railway. These locomotives differed from the rest of the D51 builds through the lack of smoke deflectors. 

The locomotives had a short service life in the Philippines as Manila Railroad ordered the dieselization of its entire network, having all steam locomotives retired by 1956.

Taiwan Railways Administration DT650

From 1936 to 1944, Kawasaki, Kisha Seizō and Hitachi had built 32 D51s for Imperial Taiwan Railway. After World War II, they were taken over by Taiwan Railways Administration, and were classified DT650. In 1951, Kisha Seizō built three DT650s and Mitsubishi Heavy Industries built two DT650s for Taiwan Railways Administration.

Classification

The classification consists of a "D" for the four sets of driving wheels and the class number 51 for tender locomotives that the numbers 50 through 99 were assigned to under the 1928 locomotive classification rule.

Preserved examples
Over 173 Class D51 locomotives are preserved in Japan. D51 498 was restored by JR East and pulls special-event trains on JR East lines.

The following is a list of preserved locomotives as of September 2012.

Operational

 D51 146: Operated on the Mooka Railway, runs on compressed air
 D51 200: Preserved in operational condition by JR West at the Kyoto Railway Museum, and is operating on Yamaguchi Line since November 2017.
 D51 320: Operated at a railway museum in Abira, Hokkaido on compressed air. (semi-operational)
 D51 498: Operated by JR East, based at Takasaki Rolling Stock Center
 D51 827: Operated at Aridagawa Railway Park in Wakayama Prefecture, runs on compressed air.

Built in 1938 at the JNR Hamamatsu Works, locomotive number D51 200 has been overhauled and restored to operational condition for use as SL Yamaguchi and SL Kitabiwako starting in 2017.

Static preservation

 D51 1: Preserved at Umekoji Steam Locomotive Museum in Kyoto
 D51 2: Previously preserved at the Modern Transportation Museum in Osaka, and moved to the Tsuyama Roundhouse next to Tsuyama Station in Okayama Prefecture in March 2015
 D51 6: Preserved in a park in Asahikawa, Hokkaido
 D51 8: Preserved in a park in Amagasaki, Hyogo
 D51 10: Preserved at a community centre in Yukuhashi, Fukuoka
 D51 11: Preserved in a park in Sapporo, Hokkaido
 D51 14: Preserved in a park in Nagareyama, Chiba
 D51 18: Preserved in Tokiwa park, Ube, Yamaguchi
 D51 25: Preserved in a park in Sanda, Hyogo
 D51 47: Preserved in a park in Iwamizawa, Hokkaido
 D51 59: Preserved in a park in Tatsuno, Nagano
 D51 66: Preserved at Kawanishi Elementary School in Seika, Kyoto
 D51 68: Preserved at Koiwai Farm in Shizukuishi, Iwate
 D51 70: Preserved at Sakura Transport Park in Tsukuba, Ibaraki
 D51 75: Preserved in a park in Joetsu, Niigata
 D51 86: Preserved at "Flower Park" in Hamamatsu, Shizuoka
 D51 89: Preserved in a park in Toyohashi, Aichi
 D51 95: Preserved at Shintoku Ski Slope in Shintoku, Hokkaido
 D51 96: Preserved at Usui Pass Railway Heritage Park in Annaka, Gunma
 D51 101: Preserved in Chuo Park in Shimada, Shizuoka
 D51 103: Preserved in a park in Iwakuni, Yamaguchi
 D51 113: Preserved in Chuo Park in Misawa, Aomori
 D51 118: Preserved in Kotesashi Park in Tokorozawa, Saitama
 D51 125: Preserved next to the Funabashi Historical Museum in Funabashi, Chiba
 D51 140: Preserved in Arakawa Park in Kumagaya, Saitama
 D51 155: Preserved outside Shiojiri City Office in Shiojiri, Nagano
 D51 158: Preserved outside a community centre in Ibaraki, Osaka
 D51 159: Preserved in a park in Iwanai, Hokkaido
 D51 165: Preserved in a park in Nanto, Toyama
 D51 170: Preserved in front of Yatake Station in Hitoyoshi, Kumamoto
 D51 172: Preserved in a park in Matsumoto, Nagano
 D51 176: Preserved in a park in Hita, Oita
 D51 187: Preserved in front of JR East's Omiya Workshops, Saitama, Saitama
 D51 194: Preserved in front of Tsuwano Station in Tsuwano, Shimane
 D51 195: Preserved in a park in Yonago, Tottori
 D51 201: Preserved outside Gamagori Museum in Gamagori, Aichi
 D51 206: Preserved in a park next to Saga City Office in Saga, Saga (numberplates have been changed)
 D51 209: Preserved in a park in Ina, Nagano
 D51 211: Preserved at Oji Zoo in Kobe, Hyogo
 D51 222: Preserved in Yogi Park, Naha, Okinawa
 D51 231: Preserved outside the National Museum of Nature and Science in Taito, Tokyo
 D51 232: Preserved at Omoriyama Zoo in Akita, Akita
 D51 237: Preserved at Naebo Works in Sapporo, Hokkaido
 D51 238: Preserved at a community centre in Kiso, Nagano
 D51 243: Preserved in Izu, Shizuoka
 D51 244: Preserved at a children's museum in Kitakyushu, Fukuoka
 D51 245: Preserved at a community centre in Sakaki, Nagano
 D51 254: Preserved in Suginami Jidō Kōtsū Park in Suginami, Tokyo
 D51 260: Preserved in a park in Namerikawa, Toyama
 D51 264: Preserved in a park in Koriyama, Fukushima
 D51 266: Preserved in a park in Nakatsugawa, Gifu
 D51 270: Preserved in Yokote Park in Yokote, Akita
 D51 272: Preserved in Setagaya Park in Setagaya, Tokyo
 D51 286: Preserved in Otaru, Hokkaido
 D51 296: Preserved in Fuchū Transport Park in Fuchū, Tokyo
 D51 297: Preserved in Takikawa, Hokkaido
 D51 300: Preserved in a park in Sanyo-Onoda, Yamaguchi
 D51 303: Preserved in a park in Tottori, Tottori
 D51 311: Preserved in SL Park in Kitami, Hokkaido
 D51 312: Preserved in Sakurayama Park in Fukagawa, Hokkaido
 D51 333: Preserved in Shiraoi, Hokkaido
 D51 337: Preserved in Wassamu, Hokkaido
 D51 345: Preserved in Taishiyama Park in Taishi, Hyogo
 D51 349: Preserved in Okaya, Nagano
 D51 351: Preserved in SL Park in Nagiso, Nagano
 D51 370: Preserved in a park in Akita, Akita
 D51 385: Preserved in a park in Kamagaya, Chiba
 D51 395: Preserved at Tokuyama Zoo in Shunan, Yamaguchi
 D51 397: Preserved in a park in Shibetsu, Hokkaido
 D51 398: Preserved in Nayoro Park in Nayoro, Hokkaido
 D51 401: Preserved at Suzaka Zoo in Suzaka, Nagano
 D51 402: Preserved at a community centre in Iida, Nagano
 D51 403: Preserved in a park in Ritto, Shiga
 D51 405: Preserved in a park in Matsudo, Chiba
 D51 408: Preserved at a museum in Kawasaki, Kanagawa
 D51 409: Preserved at Yamazaki Mazak Corporation Minokamo Factory in Minokamo, Gifu
 D51 422: Preserved in a park in Onomichi, Hiroshima
 D51 426: (Front end only) Preserved at JR East Railway Museum, Saitama, Saitama (Cab section is used as a driving simulator)
 D51 428: Preserved in Higashi-Chofu Park in Ota, Tokyo
 D51 444: Preserved at the SL Hiroba in Kitami, Hokkaido
 D51 451: Preserved in Showa Park in Akishima, Tokyo
 D51 452: Preserved at Ome Railway Park in Ōme, Tokyo
 D51 453: Preserved in Nishiguchi No. 1 Park in Kashiwa, Chiba
 D51 469: Preserved in a park in Takaishi, Osaka
 D51 470: Preserved in Bairin Park in Gifu, Gifu
 D51 481: Preserved in Minamiechizen, Fukui
 D51 483: Preserved in Azumino, Nagano
 D51 485: Preserved in a park in Nobeoka, Miyazaki
 D51 486: Preserved at JR East's Nagano Depot in Nagano, Nagano
 D51 488: Preserved at the Wako Museum in Yasugi, Shimane
 D51 499: Preserved in a park in Tsu, Mie
 D51 502: Preserved in Kamichiba Sunahara Park in Katsushika, Tokyo
 D51 512: Preserved in a park in Shibata, Niigata
 D51 513: Preserved in a park in Itabashi, Tokyo
 D51 515: Preserved in a park in Mito, Ibaraki
 D51 516: Preserved in Honmoku Shimin Park in Yokohama, Kanagawa
 D51 522: Preserved in a park in Kanazawa, Ishikawa
 D51 541: Preserved in a park in Hyuga, Miyazaki
 D51 542: Preserved inside JR Kyushu's Okura Works in Kitakyushu, Fukuoka (sectioned)
 D51 549: Preserved outside an elementary school in Nagano, Nagano
 D51 560: Preserved in Muroran, Hokkaido
 D51 561: Preserved in Kawaba, Gunma (operated at a ski resort hotel using compressed air until 2016)
 D51 565: Preserved in a park in Saroma, Hokkaido
 D51 566: Preserved in Akabira, Hokkaido (not on public display)
 D51 592: Preserved in Kudamatsu, Yamaguchi
 D51 603: Preserved in the "19th Century Hall" at Torokko Saga Station in Kyoto (Front section only)
 D51 607: Preserved in a park in Fukui, Fukui
 D51 609: Preserved in a park in Narita, Chiba
 D51 663: Preserved at a culture centre in Towada, Aomori
 D51 688: Preserved in Minami Park in Okazaki, Aichi
 D51 691: Preserved in a park in Tenri, Nara
 D51 714: Preserved in a park in Kagoshima, Kagoshima
 D51 718: Preserved in a park in Ichinomiya, Aichi
 D51 720: Preserved in a park in Hiroshima, Hiroshima
 D51 724: Preserved in Ekimae Park in Shibukawa, Gunma
 D51 735: Preserved in Murakami, Niigata
 D51 737: Preserved in Nagi Park in Yuasa, Wakayama
 D51 745: Preserved in front of Minakami Station in Minakami, Gunma
 D51 762: Preserved in a park in Hachinohe, Aomori
 D51 764: Preserved in Suita, Osaka
 D51 768: Preserved in Shimonoseki, Yamaguchi
 D51 769: Preserved outside a museum in Omi, Nagano
 D51 774: Preserved outside the former Taisha Station in Izumo, Shimane
 D51 775: Preserved in front of Kiso-Fukushima Station in Kiso, Nagano
 D51 777: Preserved in a park in Kariya, Aichi
 D51 787: Preserved in Miyota, Nagano
 D51 792: Preserved in a park in Kasugai, Aichi
 D51 793: Preserved at Nagahama Railway Square in Nagahama, Shiga
 D51 813: Preserved outside a community centre in Yamaguchi, Yamaguchi
 D51 822: Preserved in front of Mattō Station in Hakusan, Ishikawa
 D51 823: Preserved in a park in Inazawa, Aichi
 D51 824: Preserved in Suwa, Nagano
 D51 828: Preserved in Heiwa Kannon Temple in Awaji, Hyogo (closed and not open to the public)
 D51 831: Preserved in a park in Iga, Mie
 D51 837: Preserved in a park in Komagane, Nagano
 D51 838: Preserved in a car park in Niimi, Okayama
 D51 842: Preserved in a park in Kurashiki, Okayama
 D51 849: Preserved in a park in Toyota, Aichi
 D51 853: Preserved in Asukayama Park in Kita, Tokyo
 D51 859: Preserved in a park in Engaru, Hokkaido
 D51 860: Preserved in a park in Fukuyama, Hiroshima
 D51 862: Preserved in Machida, Tokyo
 D51 882: Preserved in Ibaraki, Osaka
 D51 885: Preserved in Fukaya, Saitama
 D51 889: Preserved in a park in Soja, Okayama
 D51 892: Preserved in a park in Hirosaki, Aomori
 D51 895: Preserved in a park in Oji, Nara
 D51 916: Preserved in a park in Maebashi, Gunma
 D51 917: Preserved in a park in Kita-ku, Okayama, Okayama
 D51 921: Preserved outside Shinonoi Community Centre in Nagano, Nagano
 D51 923: Preserved in Kurume, Fukuoka
 D51 930: Preserved in a park in Iwade, Wakayama
 D51 943: Preserved in a park in Fuji, Shizuoka
 D51 946: Preserved at the Coal and Fossils Museum in Iwaki, Fukushima
 D51 947: Preserved in Hakone, Kanagawa
 D51 953: Preserved outside Chuo Community Centre in Toyoura, Hokkaido
 D51 954: Preserved outside a community centre in Furano, Hokkaido
 D51 1001: Preserved in front of the Koshoku Gymnasium in Chikuma, Nagano
 D51 1032: Preserved in a park in Yufu, Ōita
 D51 1052: Preserved in Kirin Beer Park Chitose in Chitose, Hokkaido
 D51 1072: Preserved in front of Kobe Station in Kobe, Hyogo
 D51 1085: Preserved in Aridagawa Railway Park in Aridagawa, Wakayama
 D51 1101: Preserved at Mikasa Park in Yokosuka, Kanagawa
 D51 1108: Preserved at Sendai Shinkansen Depot in Rifu, Miyagi
 D51 1116: Privately preserved in Shiroi, Chiba
 D51 1119: Preserved in a park in Atsugi, Kanagawa
 D51 1142: Preserved in a park in Sasebo, Nagasaki
 D51 1149: Preserved in Taga SL Park in Taga, Shiga

Russian Class D51

 D51-1: Niigata Prefecture
 D51-2: Hokkaido
 D51-4: Sakhalin (working order, after re-gauging of the Sakhalin Railways to the Russian gauge stay in railway museum in Yuzhno-Sakhalinsk station)
 D51-22: Sakhalin (Plinthed outside Yuzhno-Sakhalinsk railway station)
 D51-23: Hokkaido
 D51-25: Hokkaido
 D51-26: Hokkaido
 D51-27: Hokkaido
 D51-28: Sakhalin (dumped at Tomari)
 D51 ? : Sakhalin (2 D51s dumped north of Yuzhno-Sakhalinsk at Dalny)

Taiwan Railways Administration DT650

DT652: Preserved at Tainan Sports Park. 
DT664: Preserved at East Stone Township, Chiayi County. (The current number is DT651)
DT668: Preserved in operational condition at Changhua Locomotive Depot. 
DT670: Preserved at Art and Literature Center, Banqiao District, New Taipei City. (The current number is DT675)

References

See also
JNR Class D50
JNR Class D52

1067 mm gauge locomotives of Japan
Steam locomotives of Japan
Steam locomotives of the Soviet Union
Steam locomotives of Taiwan
Locomotives of South Korea
2-8-2 locomotives
Hitachi locomotives
Kawasaki locomotives
Preserved steam locomotives of Japan
Railway locomotives introduced in 1936
Japan–Soviet Union relations
1′D1′ h2 locomotives